Yogeshvari (Sanskrit: योगेश्वरी), also rendered Jogeshvari, is an epithet of the Hindu goddess Durga, a contraction of Yoga-īśvarī, meaning "goddess of yoga".

Veneration 
Many Brahmins of Western India, such as Gujarat and Rajasthan, revere Yogeshvari as their kuladevi.

Yogeshvari is the kuladevi of many Chitpavan Brahmin families in Maharashtra. Yogeshvari Aai is the feminine shakti of the deity Shiva.

References

 Durga
Hinduism